Robert Thurgarton (fl. 1410s - 1430s) was a Canon of Windsor from 1437 to 1438.

Career

He was appointed:
Prebendary of Leighton Manor in Lincoln 1417
Rector of Grundisburgh, Suffolk
Rector of Molesworth, Huntingdonshire
Rector of Castor, Northamptonshire

He was appointed to the tenth stall in St George's Chapel, Windsor Castle in 1437 and held the canonry until 1438.

Notes 

Canons of Windsor